Eotrichocolea is a genus of liverworts belonging to the family Trichocoleaceae.

The species of this genus are found in Australia and New Zealand.

Species:

Eotrichocolea furukii 
Eotrichocolea polyacantha

References

Jungermanniales
Jungermanniales genera